Lærke Sofie Christensen (born 26 May 1996) is a Danish team handball player who plays for the club Holstebro Håndbold and for the Danish women's national handball team.

Individual awards 
 All-Star Best player of the Danish 1st Division: 2014/15

References

1996 births
Living people
Danish female handball players
People from Frederikshavn
Sportspeople from the North Jutland Region